The Indian Olympic Association (IOA) or Indian Olympic Committee (IOC) is the body responsible for selecting athletes to represent India at the Olympic Games, Asian Games and other international athletic meets and for managing the Indian teams at these events. It plays with the name of Team India. It also acts as the Indian Commonwealth Games Association, responsible for selecting athletes to represent India at the Commonwealth Games.

Early history

Background and early years: The background behind the creation of the Indian Olympic Association was related to India's participation in the 1920 and 1924 Olympics.  After the 1920 Games, the committee sending the team to these games met, and, on the advice of Sir Dorab Tata, invited Dr. Noehren (Physical Education Director of YMCA India) to be secretary, along with AS Bhagwat, of the provisional Indian Olympic Committee; Dorab Tata would serve as its president.  Subsequently, in 1923–24, a provisional All India Olympic Committee was formed, and the All India Olympic Games (that later became the National Games of India) were held in Feb 1924. Eight athletes from these games were selected to represent India at the 1924 Paris Olympics, accompanied by manager Harry Crowe Buck. This gave impetus to the development and institutionalization of sports in India, and, in 1927, the Indian Olympic Association (IOA), was created at the initiative of Harry Crowe Buck and Dr. A. G. Noehren (both of the Madras (YMCA) College of Physical Education). Sir Dorab Tata was important in financing and supporting the movement and became the first Indian Olympic Association president in 1927. Messrs Buck and Noehren travelled across India and helped many states organise their Olympic associations.  Noehren was the first Secretary and G. D. Sondhi was the first assistant secretary of the Indian Olympic Association, and, after Noehren resigned in 1938, Sondhi and S.M. Moinul Haq became the Secretary and Joint Secretary of the Indian Olympic Association.

And so the Indian Olympic Association was formed in 1927, and since that year was officially recognised by the International Olympic Committee as India's national Olympic organisation. In 1928, Maharaja Bhupindra Singh took over as Indian Olympic Association president.

Early tasks: 
Sending Teams to the Olympics: In its first decade, the Indian Olympic Association selected sportspersons to represent India at the Olympic Games in 1928, 1932, and 1936.  Subsequently, by 1946–47, the Indian Olympic Association took responsibility only to send the Indian team to the Olympics (principally, this meant arranging transport, board, and accommodation), while the separate federations for each sport were responsible for selecting and training competitors for their sport. Reflecting this, ahead of the 1948 Olympics, the IOA Council agreed that a team representing athletics, swimming, weight lifting, wrestling, boxing, football, and hockey, with officials for each of these sports, and a Chief Manager, would be entered for the 1948 Olympics. And so, from 1948 onward, India began sending teams representing several sports – each selected by its respective sports federation – to the Olympics. 
Securing Funding: One of the Indian Olympic Association's main early challenges was to secure funding, so that it could send the national team to the Olympics and finance the related costs of transport, room, and board.  It obtained funding from the Indian government, from the state governments, and from various state sports federations.
Illustrating this, IOA President Yadavindra Singh's appeal for funding in 1948 stated: "We need about 3 Lacs of rupees to finance" the Indian Olympic team for the London Olympics; that "the youth taking part in these games become ambassadors of goodwill" for India; and that "careful selection, intensive training and proper equipment is most essential" to field a competitive team, but that the Indian Olympic Association is "greatly handicapped for want of sufficient funds" for these tasks.

The Indian Olympic Association thus undertook wider outreach with several national sports federations, and essentially became a clearing house that coordinated the sending of multiple sports teams – each selected by their respective sports federations – to the Olympics.

The National Games: The Indian Olympic Association had one other major responsibility: that of holding the biennial National Games (Indian Olympics). It recognised, in the 1920s-1940s, that the promotion of sports in India needed a National Games, because there was no overall national sports federation of India. Instead, there were separate national federations for each sport, such as athletics, swimming, basketball, volleyball, wrestling, weightlifting, cycling, boxing, football.  These sports federations essentially held their national championships at the Indian National Games.

IOA Presidents
 * Acting

IOA Secretary Generals

IOA Executive Council
Following is the IOA Executive Committee for the 2022–2026 term.

State Olympic Associations
 Andaman and Nicobar Olympic Association
 Andhra Pradesh Olympic Association
 Arunachal Pradesh Olympic Association
 Assam Olympic Association
 Bihar Olympic Association
 Chandigarh Olympic Association
 Chhattisgarh Olympic Association
 Delhi Olympic Association
 Dadra and Nagar Haveli and Daman and Diu Olympic Association
 Goa Olympic Association
 Gujarat State Olympic Association
 Haryana Olympic Association
 Himachal Pradesh Olympic Association
 Jammu and Kashmir Olympic Association
 Jharkhand Olympic Association
 Karnataka Olympic Association
 Kerala Olympic Association
 Madhya Pradesh Olympic Association
 Maharashtra Olympic Association
 Manipur Olympic Association
 Meghalaya State Olympic Association
 Mizoram Olympic Association
 Nagaland Olympic Association
 Odisha Olympic Association
 Pondicherry Olympic Association
 Punjab Olympic Association
 Rajasthan Olympic Association
 Sikkim Olympic Association
 Tamil Nadu Olympic Association
 Olympic Association of Telangana
 Tripura State Olympic Association
 Uttarakhand Olympic Association
 Uttar Pradesh Olympic Association
 West Bengal Olympic Association
 Railways Sports Promotion Board
 Services Sports Control Board

National Sports Federations

National sports federations are categorized in two categories i.e. Olympic Sports and Other Recognized Sports

The IOC's membership currently includes 38 National Sports Federations.

IOC Permanent Olympic Sports

IOC Winter Olympic Sports
These all sports are under the Winter Games Federation of India.

IOC recognized sports

Others
Following are some sports which IOC does not recognise as a Sport.

Disputes
On 26 April 2011, after the arrest of its president Suresh Kalmadi, Vijay Kumar Malhotra was the acting president of the IOA up to 5 December 2012. The election of Lalit Bhanot as Secretary General was considered controversial by some due to his alleged involvement in the Commonwealth Games Scam.

On 4 December 2012, the International Olympic Committee suspended the IOA on the basis of corruption, government interference, and not following guidelines of the IOC. Several members of the IOA have been charged with crimes. The IOA was formally banned for not following the Olympic Charter in their elections, instead following the Indian government's Sports Code. The IOA held elections under the Indian Sports Code due to a directive from the Delhi High Court. On 15 May 2013, International Olympic Committee (IOC) decided to lift the ban on the Indian Olympic Association (IOA) as Indian representatives from the government and sports bodies reached an agreement with IOC officials. India still did not have its three competitors play under the national flag at the Winter 2014 Olympics. On 9 February, an election was held to choose a head of the IOA. Abhay Singh Chautala and Lalit Bhanot were ineligible due to having court charges against them. With the support of Abhay Singh Chautala, the president of the World Squash Federation, Narayana Ramachandran, was instead elected.

On 11 February 2014, the International Olympic Committee revoked the ban enforced on Indian Olympic Association. As a result, India returned to the Olympic fold after 14-months.

Multi-sport events hosted by IOA
 1951 Asian Games
 1982 Asian Games
 1987 South Asian Games
 1995 South Asian Games
 2003 Afro-Asian Games
 2007 Military World Games
 2008 Commonwealth Youth Games
 2010 Commonwealth Games
 2011 South Asian Winter Games
 2014 Lusophony Games
 2016 South Asian Games

Social media
The IOA is present on social media, with the Press Office of the Committee running an official Facebook page, as well as Twitter and Instagram accounts.

The IOA debuted a new logo and new campaign tag #EkIndiaTeamIndia in 2020, this was celebrated on India's independence day 15 August 2020. The previous logo was created in 1924 at the inception of the IOA, the logo emphasized the Star of India. Through symbols of the Tiraṅgā the new logo celebrates the pride, dignity and lifetime of determined hard work given by India's finest athletes. The logo was created by Smitten an international design firm founded in Chennai by Smita Rajgopal.

Recognition of athletes and coaches
From the 2016 Summer Olympics, Olympic medallists and their coaches have been given advance consideration for the National Sports Awards if they have not already received one. 

National level

State and union territory level
At the state/territorial level, Olympians receive cash awards of various amounts, depending on their home region.

Monetary awards for Olympians and coaches by state/territory (as of 2021)

See also
India at the Olympics
India at the Commonwealth Games
Paralympic Committee of India
Sport in India

References

External links
Official website 

India
India
Sports governing bodies in India
India at the Olympics
Sports organizations established in 1927
1927 establishments in India